The Greg Kihn Band is an American band that was started by frontman Greg Kihn and bassist Steve Wright. Their most successful singles include "The Breakup Song (They Don't Write 'Em)" (Billboard Hot 100 #15) and "Jeopardy" (Billboard Hot 100 #2). The band's musical style and genres comprise rock, pop rock and power pop.

History

Greg Kihn began his career as a singer-songwriter in his hometown of Baltimore, Maryland. He started writing songs and playing coffee houses while still in high school in the Baltimore area. When he was 17 his mother submitted a tape of one of his original songs to the talent contest of local Top 40 radio station WCAO, in which he took first prize and won a typewriter, a stack of records, and a Vox electric guitar.

He moved to San Francisco in 1972 and worked painting houses, singing in the streets, and working behind the counter at a Berkeley record store with future bandmate and Earth Quake keyboardist Gary Phillips. The following year, he was signed to Matthew "King" Kaufman's Beserkley Records. Along with Jonathan Richman, Earth Quake, and The Rubinoos, Kihn helped to develop the label's sound.

In 1976, after his debut on the compilation album Beserkley Chartbusters Vol. 1, Kihn formed the Greg Kihn Band, with Steve Wright on bass. Wright became the most influential member of the Greg Kihn band, co-writing Kihn's songs. Kihn recorded his first album, Greg Kihn, with his own band, now named The Greg Kihn Band, consisting of Wright, Robbie Dunbar on  guitar, and Larry Lynch on drums.

Dunbar, already a member of Earth Quake, was replaced by Dave Carpender in time to record their second album, Greg Kihn Again. The lineup of Kihn, Wright, Lynch, and Carpender lasted until 1982 (changing to a quintet in 1981 with the addition of Phillips). Guitarist Greg Douglass replaced Carpender before the band's 1983 Kihnspiracy album.

Throughout the 1970s, Kihn released an album each year and became better known during promotional touring, becoming Beserkley's biggest seller. In 1981, Kihn earned a Top 20 single, "The Breakup Song (They Don't Write 'Em)," from the RocKihnRoll album.

Kihn continued in a more commercial vein through the 1980s with a series of pun-titled albums: Kihntinued (1982), Kihnspiracy (1983), Kihntagious (1984), and Citizen Kihn (1985). His second successful single was 1983's "Jeopardy" (rising to number two) from the Kihnspiracy album. "Jeopardy" was spoofed by "Weird Al" Yankovic as "I Lost on Jeopardy" on Yankovic's album "Weird Al" Yankovic in 3-D. Kihn made a cameo appearance in the music video. In 1983, the groundbreaking "Jeopardy" video became an MTV favorite.

In 1985, Kihn broke with Beserkley Records and signed with EMI. Matthew Kaufman continued to produce Kihn's albums. "Lucky" (1985) broke the top thirty and a video sequel was made to the original "Jeopardy" video. In 1986 Joe Satriani replaced Greg Douglass on lead guitar, Tyler Eng replaced Larry Lynch on drums, and Pat Mosca replaced Gary Phillips on keyboards. This is the lineup that went into the studio to record the 1986 album Love and Rock & Roll. Satriani left the band to pursue his solo career in 1987 and was replaced by former Eddie Money lead guitarist Jimmy Lyon. Greg Kihn returned to Baltimore to record a pair of solo acoustic albums at the studios of his friend Jack Heyrman for Clean Cuts Records, Mutiny in 1994 and Horror Show in 1996.

The Greg Kihn Band continues to play with a lineup consisting of Greg's son Ry Kihn on lead guitar, Dave Danza (from Eddie Money) on drums, Dave Medd (from The Tubes) on keyboards, and Robert Berry (from Hush) on bass. Every year KFOX hosts a concert at the Shoreline Amphitheatre in Mountain View, California, called the "Kihncert" featuring The Greg Kihn Band. The Kihncert has always featured Greg Kihn as the show opener and sometime emcee, along with other KFOX FM air personalities. In addition to the Kihncert, Greg Kihn performs private, public, charity and KFOX FM-sponsored or promoted events.

Members

Current members
Greg Kihn – lead vocals, guitar (1976–present)
Ry Kihn – guitar (1996–present)
Dave Medd – keyboards (1996–present)
Robert Berry – bass (1996–present)
Dave Danza – drums (1996–present)

Former members
Robbie Dunbar – guitars, backing vocals, keyboards (1976–1977)
Steve Wright – bass, backing vocals, keyboards (1976–1996; died 2017)
Larry Lynch – drums, backing vocals (1976–1986)
Dave Carpender – guitar (1977–1983; died 2007)
Gary Phillips – keyboards, backing vocals (1981–1986; died 2007)
Greg Douglass – guitar, backing vocals (1982–1986)
Tyler Eng – drums (1986–1996)
Dennis Murphy – bass (2004–2008)
Pat Mosca – keyboards (1986–1996)
Joe Satriani – guitar (1986–1987)
Jimmy Lyon – guitar (1987–1996)

Discography

Albums

Chart singles

Music videos

References

Rock music groups from Maryland
American pop rock music groups
American power pop groups
Musical groups established in 1976
1976 establishments in Maryland